The Women's 100 metres hurdles event at the 2011 European Athletics U23 Championships was held in Ostrava, Czech Republic, at Městský stadion on 16 July.

Medalists

Results

Final
16 July 2011 / 18:35
Wind: -1.0 m/s

Heats
Qualified: First 2 in each heat (Q) and 2 best performers (q) advance to the Final

Summary

Details

Heat 1
16 July 2011 / 17:05
Wind: -0.8 m/s

Heat 2
16 July 2011 / 17:11
Wind: -0.2 m/s

Heat 3
16 July 2011 / 17:17
Wind: -0.6 m/s

Participation
According to an unofficial count, 17 athletes from 16 countries participated in the event.

References

100 metres hurdles
Sprint hurdles at the European Athletics U23 Championships
2011 in women's athletics